William Herdman may refer to:
 William Abbott Herdman (1858–1924), Scottish marine zoologist and oceanographer 
 William Gawin Herdman, English author and painter